The 1867 Ontario general election was the first general election held in the newly created Province of Ontario, Canada. Previously, the territory was known as Canada West, a part of the Province of Canada.  The election was held on September 3, 1867, to elect the 82 members of the 1st Legislative Assembly (MLAs).  The dates of the election in 1867 varied from August 20 to September 26.

The Conservative Party, led by John Sandfield Macdonald, and the Ontario Liberal Party, led by Archibald McKellar, each won 41 seats. A coalition government was formed under the leadership of Macdonald.

Votes were recorded orally. Voter eligibility was only 13% of the population.

Results

See also
List of Ontario political parties
Politics of Ontario
List of elections in the Province of Canada

References

1867
1867 elections in Canada
September 1867 events
1867 in Ontario